Sadat-e Mohammad Ebrahim (also Romanized as Sādāt-e Moḩammad Ebrāhīm) is a village in Donbaleh Rud-e Shomali Rural District, Dehdez District, Izeh County, Khuzestan Province, Iran. At the 2006 census, its population was 55, in 9 families.

References 

Populated places in Izeh County